Liu Bo (born 27 July 1985 in Liaoning) is a Chinese professional association football player.

Club career 
Liu started his senior career with Dongguan Nancheng in Hong Kong First Division League in 2003. He transferred to Zhejiang Greentown in 2006 but did not establish himself in the club. He was loaned to Guangxi Tianji in China League Two and Sichuan FC in China League One the next two seasons. He eventually made his debut for Hangzhou in a Chinese Super League game on 11 April 2009, in a 3-2 home win over Guangzhou Pharmaceutical.

In February 2010, Liu decided to move to second tier club Hunan Billows.

On 13 February 2018, Liu was banned for five months from 27 January 2018 to 26 June 2018 for age falsification.

References

External links 
 Player profile at SodaSoccer.com

1985 births
Living people
Chinese footballers
Footballers from Liaoning
Zhejiang Professional F.C. players
Hunan Billows players
Chinese Super League players
China League One players
Association football defenders